The schools in England are organised into local education authorities. There are 150 local education authorities in England organised into nine larger regions. According to the Schools Census there were 3,408 maintained government secondary schools in England in 2017.

BESA, the British Educational Suppliers Association has more up to date figures. It states that in 2019 there are 24,323 schools in England, which includes 391 nurseries, 16,769 primary schools, 3,448 secondary schools, 2,319 independent schools, 1,044 special schools and 352 pupil referral units. There are 1,170 multi-academy trusts that manage at least two schools: 598– have five or fewer schools, 259 have 6-11 schools, 85 have between 12-25 schools and 29 MATs have 26 or more schools.

East of England
There are 11 local education authorities in the East of England. 
List of schools in Bedford
List of schools in Cambridgeshire
List of schools in Central Bedfordshire
List of schools in Essex
List of schools in Hertfordshire
List of schools in Luton
List of schools in Norfolk
List of schools in Peterborough
List of schools in Southend-on-Sea
List of schools in Suffolk
List of schools in Thurrock

South East of England
There are 19 local education authorities in the South East of England.
List of schools in Bracknell Forest
List of schools in Brighton and Hove
List of schools in Buckinghamshire
List of schools in East Sussex
List of schools in Hampshire
List of schools on the Isle of Wight
List of schools in Kent
List of schools in Medway
List of schools in Milton Keynes
List of schools in Oxfordshire
List of schools in Portsmouth
List of schools in Reading
List of schools in Slough
List of schools in Southampton
List of schools in Surrey
List of schools in West Berkshire
List of schools in West Sussex
List of schools in Windsor and Maidenhead
List of schools in Wokingham

South West of England
There are 16 local education authorities in the South West of England.
List of schools in Bath and North East Somerset
List of schools in Bournemouth, Christchurch and Poole
List of schools in Bristol
List of schools in Cornwall
List of schools in Devon
List of schools in Dorset
List of schools in Gloucestershire
List of schools on the Isles Of Scilly
List of schools in North Somerset
List of schools in Plymouth
List of schools in Somerset
List of schools in Swindon
List of schools in Torbay
List of schools in Wiltshire

Yorkshire and Humber
There are 15 local education authorities in Yorkshire and Humber.
List of schools in Barnsley
List of schools in Bradford
List of schools in Calderdale
List of schools in Doncaster
List of schools in the East Riding of Yorkshire
List of schools in Hull
List of schools in Kirklees
List of schools in Leeds
List of schools in North East Lincolnshire
List of schools in North Lincolnshire
List of schools in North Yorkshire
List of schools in Rotherham
List of schools in Sheffield
List of schools in Wakefield
List of schools in York

North East of England
There are 12 local education authorities in the North East of England.
List of schools in Darlington
List of schools in Durham
List of schools in Gateshead
List of schools in Hartlepool
List of schools in Middlesbrough
List of schools in Newcastle Upon Tyne
List of schools in North Tyneside
List of schools in Northumberland
List of schools in Redcar and Cleveland
List of schools in South Tyneside
List of schools in Stockton-on-Tees
List of schools in Sunderland

North West of England
There are 23 local education authorities in the North West of England.
List of schools in Blackburn with Darwen
List of schools in Blackpool
List of schools in Bolton
List of schools in Bury
List of schools in Cumbria
List of schools in Cheshire East
List of schools in Cheshire West and Chester
List of schools in Halton
List of schools in Knowsley
List of schools in Lancashire
List of schools in Liverpool
List of schools in Manchester
List of schools in Oldham
List of schools in Rochdale
List of schools in Salford
List of schools in Sefton
List of schools in St Helens
List of schools in Stockport
List of schools in Tameside
List of schools in Trafford
List of schools in Warrington
List of schools in Wigan
List of schools in Wirral

East Midlands
There are 10 local education authorities in the East Midlands.
List of schools in Derby
List of schools in Derbyshire
List of schools in Leicester
List of schools in Leicestershire
List of schools in Lincolnshire
List of schools in North Northamptonshire
List of schools in Nottingham
List of schools in Nottinghamshire
List of schools in Rutland
List of schools in West Northamptonshire

Greater London
There are 33 local education authorities in the Greater London area.
List of schools in Barking and Dagenham
List of schools in Barnet
List of schools in Bexley
List of schools in Brent
List of schools in Bromley
List of schools in Camden
List of schools in the City of London
List of schools in Croydon
List of schools in Ealing
List of schools in Enfield
List of schools in Greenwich
List of schools in Hackney
List of schools in Hammersmith and Fulham
List of schools in Haringey
List of schools in Harrow
List of schools in Havering
List of schools in Hillingdon
List of schools in Hounslow
List of schools in Islington
List of schools in Kensington and Chelsea
List of schools in Kingston
List of schools in Lambeth
List of schools in Lewisham
List of schools in Merton
List of schools in Newham
List of schools in Redbridge
List of schools in Richmond upon Thames
List of schools in Southwark
List of schools in Sutton
List of schools in Tower Hamlets
List of schools in Waltham Forest
List of schools in Wandsworth
List of schools in Westminster

West Midlands
There are 14 local education authorities in the West Midlands.
List of schools in Birmingham
List of schools in Coventry
List of schools in Dudley
List of schools in Herefordshire
List of schools in Sandwell
List of schools in Shropshire
List of schools in Solihull
List of schools in Staffordshire
List of schools in Stoke-on-Trent
List of schools in Telford and Wrekin
List of schools in Walsall
List of schools in Warwickshire
List of schools in Wolverhampton
List of schools in Worcestershire

References

External links
Map of LEAs in the United Kingdom